Dark Fantasy was an American radio supernatural thriller anthology series. It had a short run of 31 episodes, debuting on November 14, 1941, and ending on June 19, 1942. Its writer was Scott Bishop, also known for his work on The Mysterious Traveler. It originated from station WKY in Oklahoma City and was heard Friday nights on NBC stations. The stories found a nationwide audience almost immediately.

Episodes

External links
Shedding Light on Dark Fantasy, Pt. 1
Shedding Light on Dark Fantasy, Pt. 2
The Definitive: Dark Fantasy article and log

American radio dramas
Fantasy radio programs
Horror fiction radio programmes
Horror fiction
1940s American radio programs
NBC radio programs